

Chatham County Line aka "CCL" is an American Americana musical group. Formed in Raleigh, North Carolina, in 1999 from members of the band Stillhouse, the band has released ten albums on the Yep Roc label (whom they were linked with by the producer Chris Stamey), and have become popular in Europe as well as their native United States.

The members met in 1996 when lead singer-songwriter Dave Wilson led the Country-Rock band Stillhouse.  Wilson is the son of Charlotte poet Dede Wilson and was living in the Blue House, a Raleigh crash pad and romper room for the area's hottest young musicians. The other original CCL members are mandolin/fiddle player John Teer, upright bassist/pedal steel wiz Greg Readling, and banjo picker Chandler Holt (since retired). Wilson and Readling were playing in the Blue House as "Stillhouse" when Teer and Holt became intrigued "to hear these guys playing original country music that didn't suck" as Holt recalls. Holt and Teer befriended Wilson at the Blue House and began sitting in with the band. Wilson, over a beer one night, asked the others if they were interested in starting a bluegrass band.

Chatham County Line frequently opened shows for Tift Merritt's band The Carbines as both Greg and Jay Brown (original Stillhouse Bassist) were members. Chris Stamey saw them open a show, offered to record them, and landed them a record deal with Yep Roc Records. The band then went on to create seven original studio albums, one live film/audio collection, and an album of covers: Chatham County Line in 2003, Route 23 in 2005, Speed of the Whippoorwill in 2006, IV in 2008, Wildwood in 2010, Sight & Sound in 2012, Tightrope in 2014, Autumn in 2016 and Sharing the Covers in 2019 before the retirement of original member Chandler Holt.  The Album Strange Fascination arrived in 2020 and features Sharon Van Etten singing harmonies on the title track. The band, which used to perform gathered around a single microphone, now performs live with a drummer and features pedal steel and electric guitar on stage.

The IV album includes a track, "Birmingham Jail", that tells the story of Addie Mae Collins, Denise McNair, Carole Robertson, and Cynthia Wesley, who were killed in the 16th Street Baptist Church Bombing. In The Washington Post, Allison Stewart writes:

In addition to their ten solo albums, Chatham County Line have recorded three albums with Norwegian country musician Jonas Fjeld and were additionally brought on as the backing band on Winter Stories Fjeld's collaborative album with American singer Judy Collins. To date, the band have achieved four number one albums on the Top Bluegrass Albums chart.

Discography

References

External links
Homepage

Reviews
Pitchfork
Firesideometer.com
AcousticMusic.com
Dusted Magazine
Slant
Country Standard Time
No Depression

Musical groups from Raleigh, North Carolina
American bluegrass music groups